Patrik Nagy (born 16 February 1991 in Győr) is a Hungarian midfielder who currently plays for Gyirmót.

External links
 Player profile at HLSZ 
 

Living people
1991 births
Sportspeople from Győr
Hungarian footballers
Association football midfielders
SK Rapid Wien players
Vasas SC players
Újpest FC players
Kecskeméti TE players
SV Seligenporten players
Szombathelyi Haladás footballers
Soproni VSE players
Gyirmót FC Győr players
Nemzeti Bajnokság I players
Hungarian expatriate footballers
Expatriate footballers in Austria
Hungarian expatriate sportspeople in Austria